Fritz Landertinger (26 February 1914 – 18 January 1943) was an Austrian canoeist who competed in the late 1930s. He won the silver medal in the K-1 10000 m event at the 1936 Summer Olympics in Berlin. He was killed in action during World War II.

References

External links
Databaseolympics.com profile

1914 births
1943 deaths
Austrian male canoeists
Canoeists at the 1936 Summer Olympics
Olympic canoeists of Austria
Olympic silver medalists for Austria
Olympic medalists in canoeing
Medalists at the 1936 Summer Olympics
Austrian military personnel killed in World War II
20th-century Austrian people